Christina Drechsler (1982 - 2023) was a German actress. 

She was born in 1982 in Berlin.  Her acting credits include Cracks in the Shell (2011),   (2008) and Kleeblatt küsst Kaktus (2002). From 2003 to 2013 she was part of the  Berliner Ensemble.

Christina Drechsler died in early 2023.

External links

Living people
1982 births
German film actresses
Actresses from Berlin
Date of birth missing (living people)
21st-century German actresses